"Doncamatic" is a single by British alternative band Gorillaz. The track features British singer Daley. The single was released on 21 November 2010 via digital download, with a physical release following the next day.  It charted at No.37 in the UK Charts and as of 2023, remains their last UK Top 40 hit.

The track's title refers to Korg's Disc Rotary Electric Auto Rhythm Machine Donca Matic DA-20. Released in 1963, it was the first rhythm machine manufactured by Korg. A later version of this machine can be seen built onto the right side of the contraption behind Daley in the music video. The song, alongside the Joker remix are included as bonus tracks on the French CD reissue of Plastic Beach.

Music video
The music video premiered worldwide on 15 November 2010 on Myspace. The video features a live-action Daley in a one-man submarine, on his journey to join Gorillaz and the rest of the collaborators on Plastic Beach. 2-D, dressed as a sailor, can be seen on a small screen inside the submarine whenever "talk to me" is sung in the song, as if he is trying to contact Daley. Daley travels all around the ocean to find Plastic Beach, seeing different kinds of fish, such as the Superfast Jellyfish seen in the "On Melancholy Hill", "Stylo", and "Superfast Jellyfish" music videos. He also finds the wreckage of the M. Harriet. At the end of the video, he travels around the island underwater and rises up on the surface, finally arriving at Plastic Beach.

Track listing

Personnel
Daley – vocals
Damon Albarn – vocals, synthesizers, drum programming, sampled loops
Geoff Pesche – mastering engineer
Jason Cox – mixing engineer
Stephen Sedgwick – engineering, programming

Charts

References

Gorillaz songs
2010 singles
2010 songs
Parlophone singles
Songs written by Damon Albarn
Daley (musician) songs